Chesiadodes is a genus of moths in the family Geometridae.

Species
 Chesiadodes bicolor Rindge, 1973
 Chesiadodes cinerea Rindge, 1973
 Chesiadodes coniferaria (Grossbeck, 1912)
 Chesiadodes curvata (Barnes & McDunnough, 1916)
 Chesiadodes dissimilis Rindge, 1973
 Chesiadodes fusca Rindge, 1973
 Chesiadodes longa Rindge, 1973
 Chesiadodes morosata Hulst, 1896
 Chesiadodes polingi (Cassino, 1927)
 Chesiadodes simularia (Barnes & McDunnough, 1918)
 Chesiadodes tubercula Rindge, 1973

References
 Chesiadodes at Markku Savela's Lepidoptera and Some Other Life Forms
 Natural History Museum Lepidoptera genus database

Geometridae genera
Ennominae